Gerald Shaughnessy,  (May 19, 1887 – May 18, 1950) was an American prelate of the Roman Catholic Church. He served as bishop of the Diocese of Seattle in Washington State from 1933 until his death in 1950.

Biography

Early life 
Gerald Shaughnessy was born on May 19, 1887, in Everett, Massachusetts, to Joseph and Margarett (née Colwell) Shaughnessy. In 1909 he graduated from Boston College, where he had won the Cronin scholarship. He then taught at private and public schools in Maryland, Montana and Utah.  In 1916, Shaughnessy entered the Society of Mary. He studied theology at Marist College and the Catholic University of America in Washington, D.C., earning a Bachelor of Sacred Theology degree in 1920.

Priesthood 
Shaughnessy was ordained to the priesthood for the Marists on June 20, 1920. He became an official of the apostolic delegation in 1919. Returning to the Marist College, he served as professor of moral theology from 1920 to 1933. During this period, Shaughnessy was also a professor at Notre Dame Seminary from 1923 to 1924 and spent time teaching at Marist facilities in Rome and Lyons, France (1930–1931). Shaughnessy became novice master at the Marist College in 1932.

Bishop of Seattle 
On July 1, 1933, Shaughnessy was appointed the fourth bishop of the Diocese of Seattle by Pope Pius XI. He received his episcopal consecration on September 19, 1933 from Archbishop Amleto Cicognani, with Bishops Michael Keyes and Charles White serving as co-consecrators. 

Shaughnessy kept the diocese financially stable during the Great Depression. He encouraged the formation of Serra International and served as its first chaplain. He also supported the St. Vincent de Paul Society and Catholic Charities. chapters in the diocese.

In November 1945, Shaughnessy suffered a cerebral hemorrhage while returning from the annual bishops meeting in Washington, D.C.In 1948, Pope Pius XII appointed Bishop Thomas Connolly as coadjutor bishop to assist Shaughnessy, who had not fully recovered from his stroke.

Death and legacy 
Gerald Shaughnessy died in his home on First Hill in Seattle on May 18, 1950. Due to construction at St. James Cathedral, the funeral was held at Immaculate Conception Church; it was celebrated by Archbishop Edward Howard.

Viewpoints

Politics 
In a 1941 Easter sermon, Shaughnessy criticized Republican presidential candidate Wendell Willkie for a remark that Willkie later dismissed as "campaign oratory". During the 1940 presidential campaign, Willkie had claimed that if reelected, President Franklin Roosevelt would push the nation into World War II by April 1941. Willkie later downplayed this statement. After Willkie demanded an apology from Shaughnessy, he declared that Willkie was not; "...the man he used to be, and in fact he never was ... And speaking of 'apology,' Mr. Willkie, I believe that you owe one to your party, to those who voted for you and to the whole nation."

War 
During World War II, Shaughnessy condemned discrimination against Japanese-Americans and opposed American participation in warfare abroad.

References

1887 births
1950 deaths
Boston College alumni
Catholic University of America alumni
People from Everett, Massachusetts
American Roman Catholic clergy of Irish descent
20th-century Roman Catholic bishops in the United States
Roman Catholic bishops of Seattle
Catholics from Massachusetts